Lindstrom is a Swedish surname.

Lindstrom may also refer to:

Places
 Lindstrom, Minnesota, United States
 Lindstrøm Peak, in the Queen Maud Mountains, Antarctica
 Lindstrom Peninsula, Ellesmere Island, Nunavut, Canada
 Lindstrom Ridge, in the Darwin Mountains, Antarctica
 5281 Lindstrom, a minor planet

Other uses
 Lindström (company), a multinational textile services company
 Carl Lindström Company, a global record company
 Lindström quantifier, a family of sets in mathematical logic
 Lindström's theorem, a mathematical result concerning first-order logic
 Lindstrom Field, a sport stadium in Lindsborg, Kansas, United States
 Lindstrom House, a residence in Bainbridge Island, Washington, United States